is a Japanese footballer who plays as a midfielder for Toyama Shinjo in Hokushinetsu Football League.

Club statistics

References

External links

 Profile at Kataller

1991 births
Living people
Association football people from Toyama Prefecture
Japanese footballers
J2 League players
J3 League players
Japan Football League players
Kataller Toyama players
SP Kyoto FC players
Association football midfielders